Cormac Beausang (born 1997) is an Irish hurler who plays for Cork Senior Championship club Midleton and at inter-county level with the Cork senior hurling team. He usually lines out at midfield.

Playing career

Midleton

Beausang joined the Midleton club at a young age and played in all grades at juvenile and underage levels. On 8 December 2018, he scored two points from midfield when Midleton suffered a 3-24 to 4-18 defeat by Fr. O'Neill's in the final of the Premier Under-21 Championship.

On 25 June 2017, Beausang made his first senior championship appearance for the club in a 2-25 to 4-15 defeat of Erin's Own.

Cork

Minor

Beausang first lined out for Cork as a member of the minor team during the 2015 Munster Championship. He was a member of the extended panel throughout the championship and saw no game time.

Senior

Beausang made his first appearance for the Cork senior team on 2 January 2019 when he was introduced as a 25th-minute substitute for Robbie O'Flynn in a 1-24 to 1-18 defeat by Waterford in the Munster Senior League. On 5 January, he scored a point from left corner-forward when Cork defeated University College Cork to win the Canon O'Brien Cup. Beausang was added to the Cork senior hurling team for their National Hurling League game against Limerick on 24 February.

Career statistics

Club

Inter-county

Honours

Cork
Canon O'Brien Cup (1): 2019

References

1997 births
Living people
Midleton hurlers
Cork inter-county hurlers